Coben is a surname, and may refer to:

Cy Coben (1919-2006), American songwriter 
Harlan Coben (born 1962), American author
Lawrence S. Coben (born 1958), American archaeologist
Muriel Coben (1921-1979), Canadian baseball and curling player
Sherry Coben (?), American television writer